Crisis Beat is a 1998 video game for the Sony PlayStation, developed by Japanese studio Soft Machine and published by Bandai. It is a beat-em-up style game. The story is set on a cruise liner where terrorists hijack the ship and the player must pick a pair of characters to fight back.

Gameplay 
It is a beat-em-up style game in full 3D. The player can choose between two pairs of characters to play as. Stages consist of the player fighting various waves of enemies primarily in hand to hand combat and moving to the next stage once every enemy has been defeated.

Release 
The game was released for July 18, 1998 for the Sony PlayStation.

Reception

It was released on Jun 18, 1998 for the Sony PlayStation in Japan, and in 2000 in Europe. It was re-released in 2013 on PlayStation Network.

References

External links
 Official website (in Japanese)

1998 video games
Beat 'em ups
PlayStation (console) games
PlayStation Network games
Video games developed in Japan
Bandai games